The 2015–16 Liga MX season  (known as the Liga BBVA Bancomer MX for sponsorship reasons) was the 69th professional season of the top-flight football league in Mexico. The season was split into two championships—the Torneo Apertura and the Torneo Clausura—each in an identical format and each contested by the same eighteen teams.

Teams, stadiums, and personnel
The following eighteen teams competed this season. Universidad de Guadalajara was relegated to the Ascenso MX after accumulating the lowest coefficient last season. Leones Negros were replaced by the 2015 Clausura Ascenso MX champion Dorados de Sinaloa, who won promotion after defeating the Apertura 2014 winner Necaxa in a promotion play-off.

Stadiums and locations

Stadium Changes

Personnel and kits

Managerial changes

Torneo Apertura
The Apertura 2015 is the first championship of the season. The regular season will begin on July 24, 2015. Santos Laguna are the defending champions, having won their 5th Title.

Regular season

Standings

Results

Season statistics

Top goalscorers
Players sorted first by goals scored, then by last name.

Source: Liga MX.net

Top assists
Players sorted first by assists, then by last name.

Source: ESPN FC

Hat-tricks

4 Player scored four goals

Attendance 
The Average overall attendance for the Apertura 2015 is 24,768.

Per team

Source: LigaMX.net

Highest and lowest

Source: LigaMX.net

Liguilla - Apertura

Bracket

 Teams are re-seeded each round.
 Team with more goals on aggregate after two matches advances.
 Away goals rule is applied in the quarterfinals and semifinals, but not the final.
 In the quarterfinals and semifinals, if the two teams are tied on aggregate and away goals, the higher seeded team advances.
 In the final, if the two teams are tied after both legs, the match goes to extra-time and, if necessary, a shootout.
 Both finalists qualify to the 2016–17 CONCACAF Champions League (in Pot 3).

Quarterfinals

Semifinals

Finals

Torneo Clausura
The Clausura 2016 is the second championship of the season. The regular phase of the tournament began on January 8, 2016.

Regular season

Standings

Positions by round
The table lists the positions of teams after each week of matches. In order to preserve chronological evolvements, any postponed matches are not included in the round at which they were originally scheduled, but added to the full round they were played immediately afterwards. For example, if a match is scheduled for matchday 13, but then postponed and played between days 16 and 17, it will be added to the standings for day 16.

Results

Regular season statistics

Top goalscorers
Players sorted first by goals scored, then by last name.

Source: ESPN FC

Top assists
Players sorted first by assists, then by last name.

Source: ESPN FC

Hat-tricks

Clean sheets

Source: Fox Soccer

Saves

Fox Soccer

Attendance

Liguilla - Clausura

Bracket

 Teams are re-seeded each round.
 Team with more goals on aggregate after two matches advances.
 Away goals rule is applied in the quarterfinals and semifinals, but not the final.
 In the quarterfinals and semifinals, if the two teams are tied on aggregate and away goals, the higher seeded team advances.
 In the final, if the two teams are tied after both legs, the match goes to extra-time and, if necessary, a shootout.
 Both finalists qualify to the 2016–17 CONCACAF Champions League (in Pot 3).

Quarterfinals

Semifinals

Final

Relegation table

Last update: 8 May 2016
R = Relegated

Aggregate table
The Aggregate table (the sum of points of both the Apertura and Clausura tournaments) is used to determine the participants of the next season's Copa MX.

References

External links
 Official website of Liga MX
  Mediotiempo.com

 
Mx

1
Liga MX seasons